Zanella is a surname. Notable people with the surname include:

Christopher Zanella (born 1989), Swiss racing driver
François Zanella (born 1949), mine worker
Giacomo Zanella (1820-1888), Italian poet
Luana Zanella (born 1950), Italian politician
Rafaela Zanella (born 1986), Brazilian beauty pageant titleholder
Renato Zanella (born 1961), Italian ballet dancer
Riccardo Zanella (1875-1959), Italian politician

Surnames of Italian origin